The 2015 Montana State Bobcats football team represented Montana State University as a member of the Big Sky Conference during the 2015 NCAA Division I FCS football season. Led by Rob Ash in his ninth and final season as head coach, Montana State compiled an overall record of 5–6 with a mark of 3–5 in conference play, placing in a three-way tie for eighth place in the Big Sky. The Bobcats played their home games at Bobcat Stadium in Bozeman, Montana.

On November 24, Ash was fired. He finished his tenure as Montana State with a nine-year record of 70–38.

Schedule

The game with Eastern Washington on September 19 was not counted as a conference game even though Eastern Washington was also a member of the Big Sky Conference.

Coaching staff

Game summaries

Fort Lewis

at Eastern Washington

Cal Poly

at Northern Arizona

Sacramento State

at Portland State

East Tennessee State

at North Dakota

Southern Utah

at Idaho State

Montana

Ranking movements

References

Montana State
Montana State Bobcats football seasons
Montana State Bobcats football